Heenan is a surname of Irish origin. Notable people with the surname include:

 Ben Heenan (born 1990), American footballer
 Bobby Heenan (1944–2017), American wrestler
 Brian Heenan (born 1937), Australian Roman Catholic bishop
 Catherine Heenan, American journalist
 Daniel Heenan (born 1981), Australian rugby player
 Deirdre Heenan, academic
 Donald Heenan (1908–1961), New Zealand cricketer
 Eric Heenan (born 1945), Australian lawyer
 Eric Heenan (politician) (1900–1998), Australian politician
 George Heenan (1855–1912), New Zealand cricketer
 Jake Heenan (born 1992), New Zealand rugby player
 Jerry Heenan (1941-2010), Canadian professional wrestler 
 Joe Heenan (1888–1951), New Zealand law draftsman
 John Heenan (disambiguation), several persons
 Katie Heenan (born 1985), American gymnast
 Maurice Heenan (1912–2000), New Zealand lawyer
 Mick Heenan, Australian professional rugby union coach
 Patrick Heenan (disambiguation), several persons
 Paul Heenan, the guitarist of the  American rock band Monovox
 Peter Brian Heenan, (born 1961), New Zealand botanist
 Peter Heenan (1875–1948), Canadian politician
 Roy Heenan (1935–2017), Canadian lawyer

See also
 Heenan & Froude, a United Kingdom-based engineering company
 Heenan Blaikie LLP, Canadian law firm
 The Heenan Family, a stable of wrestlers
 Heenan Highway, part of Ontario Highway 71, Canada

Surnames of Irish origin